Prunier is a French surname. Notable people with the surname include:

 Alfred Prunier (1848–1925), French chef and restaurant owner
 Camille Prunier, French wrestler
 William Prunier (born 1967), French footballer and manager
 Gérard Prunier (born 1942), French academic and historian